A jetty may be a variety of structures employed in river, dock, and maritime works. Jetty may also refer to:

Architecture and construction
Jetty, a term for an overhang (architecture) in the American colonial architecture
Jettying, a building technique used in medieval timber-frame buildings

Other uses
Jetty (podcast network), a podcast network from Al Jazeera Media Network
Jetty (web server), an HTTP server and servlet container written in Java

See also